Dmitriy Vasilevich Polenov (1806-1878) was the secretary of the Imperial Russian Archaeological Society in Russia in the mid-nineteenth century. His daughter was the artist Elena Dmitrievna Polenova (born Petrozavodsk in 1850).

References

External links
https://www.prlib.ru/en/node/680403
https://www.net-film.eu/film-38756/

Archaeologists from Saint Petersburg
1806 births
1878 deaths
Privy Councillor (Russian Empire)